Serapio Calderón Lasso de la Vega (September 14, 1843 – April 3, 1922) served as Interim President of Peru, officially as the President of the Government Junta, from May 7, 1904 to September 24, 1904.

Calderón was born in Paucartambo (Cusco Region) in September, 1843. He was elected second vice president with Manuel Candamo in 1903. The first vice president was Lino Alarco, who had died before his investiture. Under such circumstance, Calderón had to assume the presidency on May 7, 1904 after the death of Candamo. Calderon called for elections and José Pardo y Barreda of the Civilista Party was declared the winner. He governed until September 24, 1904, before he was succeeded by Pardo.

He died in Cusco on April, 1922.

References

1843 births
1922 deaths
Presidents of Peru
Vice presidents of Peru